Gilbert Pickering may refer to:

 Sir Gilbert Pickering, 1st Baronet (1611–1668), regicide and politician
 Sir Gilbert Pickering, 3rd Baronet (c. 1669–1736), English member of parliament
 Gilbert Pickering (14th century MP) for Bristol